Fieldia australis, usually referred to as fieldia, is a small climbing plant or epiphyte found in eastern Australian rainforests. Commonly seen in the cooler rainforests at higher altitudes. It also grows in the warmer rainforests with a high humidity. The plant uses adventitious roots to grip hold of tree trunks, mossy rocks or tree ferns.

Leaves are 3 to 7 cm long 1 to 3 cm wide, reverse ovate or elliptical in shape with toothed edges. The leaf stem is around 8 mm long. Flowering occurs mostly in summer or autumn, being an attractive, relatively long thin white flower. The fruit is a whitish berry with some purple markings. Egg-shaped or oblong, 1 to 3 cm long, and around 11 mm in diameter.

Taxonomy
Fieldia australis was originally described and placed in its own genus Fieldia by botanist Allan Cunningham in 1825. The name Fieldia honours Barron Field (1786–1846), judge of the Supreme Court of New South Wales, amateur naturalist and editor of the book Geographical Memoirs on New South Wales in which the genus and species name were first published. A second species, Fieldia australiana, was subsequently described.

References

Gesnerioideae
Epiphytes
Flora of New South Wales
Flora of Queensland
Flora of Victoria (Australia)
Monotypic Lamiales genera
Gesneriaceae genera